Wagner O. Jorgensen (July 31, 1913 – July 24, 1977) was an American football center who played two seasons with the Brooklyn Dodgers of the National Football League. He was drafted by the Brooklyn Dodgers in the third round of the 1936 NFL Draft. He played college football at Saint Mary's College of California and attended San Mateo High School in San Mateo, California.

References

External links
Just Sports Stats

1913 births
1977 deaths
Players of American football from California
American football centers
American football linebackers
Saint Mary's Gaels football players
Sportspeople from the San Francisco Bay Area
Brooklyn Dodgers (NFL) players
Danish players of American football
People from San Mateo, California